The Communist Party of Ireland (CPI) is an all-Ireland Marxist–Leninist communist party, founded in 1933 and re-founded in 1970. It rarely contests elections and has never had electoral success. The party is a member of the International Meeting of Communist and Workers' Parties.

Originating as multiple Revolutionary Workers' Groups, located at Connolly House in Dublin, the most prominent early member was James Larkin Jnr (son of James Larkin). After being outlawed under the government of W. T. Cosgrave in 1931 (as part of a wider crackdown on Peadar O'Donnell's Saor Éire and the IRA), it was legalised in 1932 under Éamon de Valera's government and subsequently changed its name to the Communist Party of Ireland in 1933 under Seán Murray, who had attended the Lenin School in Moscow.

A strong anti-communist public backlash in Ireland occurred around the time of the Spanish Civil War due to the perception that the Popular Front cause was anti-Catholic. The already small CPI found it very difficult to organise. Nevertheless, some CPI members fought in the conflict, alongside Republican Congress members, under the XV International Brigade.

Some Irish communists opposed Ireland being brought into the Second World War and particularly opposed conscription into the British Armed Forces being applied to Northern Ireland in the conflict. Some members were held in Curragh Camp by the government during the Emergency, including the CPI's future General Secretary, Michael O'Riordan. Following the entry of the Soviet Union into World War II in 1941, the party dissolved itself and instructed members to join the Irish Labour Party.

In 1970, the Irish Workers' Party and the Communist Party of Northern Ireland merged into a reunited Communist Party of Ireland. Throughout the period of the Cold War, the CPI openly aligned with the Soviet Union. During the Troubles, the party procured some arms for the faction which became the Official IRA. The party closely supported the Cuban Revolution and campaigns such as the Birmingham Six. Minor splits from the CPI included the Eurocommunist-inspired Irish Marxist Society.

History

Background
The earliest attempt to form a communist political party in Ireland was a result of the Socialist Party of Ireland, founded by James Connolly, changing its name to the Communist Party of Ireland and affiliating with the Communist International in 1921. This organisation was relatively small and included among its ranks figures such as Roddy Connolly and Nora Connolly O'Brien (children of James Connolly, who was killed in the aftermath of the Easter Rising), as well as writers Liam O'Flaherty and Peadar O'Donnell. In practice, this organisation was heavily allied to the anti-Treaty IRA but distinguished itself by calling for a workers' republic. It had one elected TD, Patrick Gaffney, who switched from the Irish Labour Party.

This earlier group disbanded in 1923 and joined the Irish Worker League founded by James Larkin as the Irish representative of Comintern (along with Larkin's Workers' Union of Ireland). Larkin broke off his affiliation with Comintern in 1928 after a period of private disillusionment with the Soviet Union. The Connolly siblings attempted to set up a replacement, the Revolutionary Workers' and Working Farmers' Party, but this lasted barely a month. Activists associated with James Larkin Jnr (who had attended the Lenin School in Moscow) founded the Revolutionary Workers' Groups in 1930 with their The Irish Workers' Voice (distinguished from Larkin Snr's The Irish Worker) to fully replace the first Communist Party of Ireland.

Early years
The original CPI was founded in 1933 by the Revolutionary Workers' Groups.  As the Soviet Union switched to the side of the Allies in the war after the German invasion in 1941, this proved even more difficult, and the party split; the Protestant-dominated Communist Party of Northern Ireland became a separate body, and the party in the Irish Republic suspended its activities and entered the Irish Labour Party (before being expelled and forming the Irish Workers' League).

In the first half of the 20th century, the Communist Party failed to gain any traction. The party provided most of the Irish volunteers on the government side in the 1936–39 Spanish Civil War, losing members who were killed in action. The Communist Party of Ireland was involved in establishing the Republican Congress in 1934, bringing communists, republicans, trade unionists and tenants' organisations together.

Following the entry of the Soviet Union into World War II, the Communist Party of Ireland in the Republic of Ireland disbanded, with its member instructed to join the Labour Party en masse, with Jim Larkin mostly notably taking the lead.  

The party was revived in one form in the Republic in 1948 under the name Irish Workers' League, which changed its name in 1962 to the Irish Workers' Party. In the mid-1960s, the U.S. State Department estimated the party membership to be approximately 100.

1970s and 1980s
The Communist Party of Ireland re-formed in 1970.

Historically, the party belonged to the wing of international communism that looked to the Soviet Union for inspiration.  In the late 1960s, some IWP members (notably Michael O'Riordan) became active in the Dublin Housing Action Committee. The IWP also condemned the Soviet Invasion of Czechoslovakia, although O'Riordan was opposed to this position. In March 1970, following the CPNI/IWP merger, the new Communist Party of Ireland issued a manifesto called For Unity and Socialism, advocating the election of left-wing governments in both parts of Ireland, and, eventually, the creation of a United Ireland.

One notable split from the CPI was the Eurocommunist group the Irish Marxist Society, which left the CPI around 1976. The IMS was founded by Joe Deasy (1922–2013), Sam Nolan (1930-), Paddy Carmody, George Jeffares, Mick O'Reilly (1946-) and other former CPI members. The IMS advocated Marxist feminism and was also outspoken in its rejection of the Two Nations Theory of Northern Ireland. Most of the IMS's members later joined the Irish Labour Party, where they played a leading role in the formation of Labour Left.

The CPI strongly criticised the Anglo-Irish Agreement, claiming the AIA "underlined Partition and gave Britain a direct say in the affairs of the Republic". In the 1980s, its membership declined significantly during the electoral rise of the Workers' Party and this trend continued after the dissolution of the Soviet Union. The party's aim is to win the support of the majority of the Irish people for ending the capitalist system and for building socialism. It is actively opposed to neo-liberalism and to the European Union. 

Autobiographical accounts of the party in this period have been written by Mick O'Reilly, Helena Sheehan and Kevin McMahon.

2010s and 2020s
The party stood two candidates in the 2014 local elections, neither was elected. The CPI fielded one candidate for the 2016 Dáil Éireann election for the Cork North-West constituency.

In January 2021, the Connolly Youth Movement dropped its support for the programme of the CPI. In February, the CPI issued a statement stating that several dual (CPI-CYM) members had been expelled for severe breaches of discipline and factional behaviour within the CPI prior to the CYM's decision to drop its support for the programme of the CPI.

On 2 June 2021, the CPI released a statement distancing itself from its former Belfast branch due to the actions of former party members in the city. The statement also announced the founding of a new Greater Belfast branch to replace the Belfast branch and noted that the branch's social media pages and Unity newspaper were still in the hands of the former members of the Belfast branch.

After Russia invaded Ukraine in February 2022, the party called for an immediate ceasefire and political solution to bring about a "demilitarised, neutral Ukraine", saying it was an "inter-imperialist war". The CPI opposes the Ukrainian Government, stating the 2014 Ukrainian Revolution was a US-backed "coup". The CPI blamed the war on "the expansion of NATO", stating it had built up "large bases of troops and mass destructive weapons along [Russia's] western and southern borders". When it was announced the Irish Defence Forces would train Ukraine's military in mine clearing, the CPI condemned this as "collaboration of the Irish political establishment in the NATO-EU strategy to escalate and prolong the war in Ukraine".

Organisation and activity
The general secretary of the party is Jimmy Corcoran. The CPI publishes a monthly magazine called Socialist Voice. There are also branches in Cork, Galway, Munster, and Mid-Ulster.

While it is a registered party, the CPI has rarely run candidates in elections and has never had electoral success. The CPI operates a bookshop in Dublin called Connolly Books, which is named after the Irish socialist James Connolly.

The party and its members are prominent in a number of campaigns such as advocating a "No" vote in the Lisbon Treaty referendums. The party has also advocated a referendum on the Irish bailout of banks. It also continues to oppose the European Union and membership of the euro currency. The CPI set up the Repudiate The Debt campaign to further this objective.  The CPI is active in Right2Water Ireland and has called for a constitutional amendment to enshrine ownership of water in the hands of the Irish people and not the state. The party also supported the anti-war movement in Ireland as part of the Peace and Neutrality Alliance. The CPI is heavily involved in campaigning groups such as the Trade Union Left Forum, Peadar O'Donnell Socialist Republican Forum, the Campaign For Public Housing and CATU Tenants Union. The party is recognised for its support of left wing and anti imperialist projects around the world. It has regular interaction with, and solidarity actions for countries such as Cuba, Venezuela, Nicaragua, Bolivia, Vietnam, and China.

In November 2017, the Standards in Public Office Commission stated that some statements of accounts had been received from the CPI, but they were found not to be compliant because the accounts were not audited.  It decided against appointing a public auditor as the CPI did not receive any funding from the exchequer.

General secretaries
1933–1941: Sean Murray
1941: Tommy Watters
1970–1983: Michael O'Riordan
1984–2001: Jimmy Stewart
2002–2023: Eugene McCartan
2023–present: Jimmy Corcoran

Chairpersons
 1970–1983: Andy Barr
 1983–1989: Michael O'Riordan
 1989–2001: Eugene McCartan
 2001–2004: Jimmy Stewart
 2004–2017: Lynda Walker
 2018–2021: John Pinkerton
 2021–2022: Janelle McAteer
 2023–present: Ciara Ní Mhaoilfhinn

Timeline
 1933 – Revolutionary Workers' Groups are disbanded and Communist Party of Ireland created
 1941 – National Committee suspends independent activity and urges members to join the labour and trade union movements, members in Northern Ireland form the Communist Party of Northern Ireland
 1948 – Irish Workers' League established
 1962 – Irish Worker's League renamed Irish Workers' Party
 1970 – Irish Workers' Party and Communist Party of Northern Ireland merge to form the Communist Party of Ireland.
 1976 – A number of members left to form the Irish Marxist Society
 2021 – CPI National Executive Committee votes to end CPI-CYM dual membership

References

External links
 
 Connolly Media Group at YouTube
 History of the Communist Movement in Ireland
  The storming of CPI headquarters, Connolly House (1933)
 Irish Left Online Document Archive – Contains PDF documents of CPI material, with commentary

 
All-Ireland political parties
Communist parties in Ireland
Communist parties in Northern Ireland
Far-left politics in Ireland
International Meeting of Communist and Workers Parties